Silvina Schlesinger (born 28 March 1985) is an Argentine handball goalkeeper from. She defends Argentina, such as at the 2011 World Women's Handball Championship in Brazil.

References

1985 births
Argentine people of German descent
Living people
Argentine female handball players
Handball players at the 2011 Pan American Games
Handball players at the 2007 Pan American Games
Pan American Games medalists in handball
Pan American Games bronze medalists for Argentina
Medalists at the 2007 Pan American Games
Medalists at the 2011 Pan American Games
20th-century Argentine women
21st-century Argentine women